Tuan Vu may refer to:
 Tom Vu, Vietnamese American poker player.
 Tuấn Vũ, Vietnamese singer.